Dhameta is a village in Kangra district, Himachal Pradesh, India. Most of the villagers speak Pahari, Hindi or Punjabi, with Hindi most widely used. Panchayati Raj functions as a system of governance in Dhameta.

Geography

The geographic coordinates of Dhameta are latitude 32.0459217 and longitude 75.9620529. Shimla, the state capital, is around  kilometers away from Dhameta.

The nearest railway station to Dhameta is Bharmar, 1 hr 5 min (36.3 km)
via Maira Palli Rd away.
Other airports around Dhameta include Pathankot Airport at	 distance, and Bhuntar Airport at	.

Famous Landmarks
Famous Landmark in Dhameta are the submerged 'Bathu ki Ladi Temples' which can only be approached by boat from here or from Nagrota Surian or have to travel 23 km by road from Dhameta.

The folklore tells a story dating back to Mahabharata when Pandavas attempted to build a staircase to ascend to Heaven at monolithic Masrur Rock Temples located on the opposite of the lake but we're stopped by Indira. But, successfully built the 'Stairway to Heaven' at 'Bathu ki Ladi' temples where that staircase still exists even today and one can climb to the top most part to have a feel. The central temple is dedicated to Lord Shiva

Other famous places in Dhameta township  for pilgrims are
Mansa Devi Temple and Shani Dev Temple in Lower Bazaar.

Schools
The nearest schools to Dhameta are as follows:
Govt. Sen. Sec. School Dhameta
Gurukul Model School, Dhameta
Adarsh Model High School Chatta Khad	1.3 km;
Gyan Jyoti Public School 2.2 km;
Primary Middle School	2.4 km;
Siyal Primary School	4.1 km.

Architects
The most reputed Architectural firm of north India "Sohal Group". Founded by Mr. Shubham Sohal in 2018, Situated at Lower Bazaar Dhameta.

Shops
Lok Mitra Kendra Dhameta is now opened inside the building of Gram Panchayat Dhameta
 
Madan sweet shop
Dairy products, cheese, curd, cold drinks, fresh sweets, namkeen etc. are available at Madan Sweet shop at Lower Bazaar Dhameta

Mehra Sweet Shop Near Bus Stand. Fresh Sweets, Snacks, Cold drink, Dairy Product available.

Madan Kariyana shop. Where all daily needs items are available. Location near to Madan sweet shop.

References

Villages in Kangra district